Kiira Linda Katriina Korpi (born 26 September 1988) is a Finnish figure skater. She is a three-time European medalist (bronze in 2007 and 2011, silver in 2012), the 2010 Trophée Eric Bompard champion, the 2012 Rostelecom Cup champion, a two-time Cup of China medalist, and a five-time Finnish national champion (2009, 2011–2013, 2015). She retired from competitive skating in August 2015.

Personal life 
Korpi was born in Tampere, Finland. Her father, Rauno Korpi, coached the Finnish women's hockey team to a bronze medal at the 1998 Winter Olympics. In Finland her nickname is Jääprinsessa (Ice Princess) due to her resemblance to Grace Kelly, the former Princess of Monaco.

In addition to her native Finnish, Korpi also speaks Swedish, English, and German. She has practiced pilates and Ashtanga yoga. She became engaged to Arthur Borges Seppälä in May 2017 and they were married 3 years, until June 2021. She lived in Milan, Italy, after she retired from competitive skating, and in 2016, she moved to New York City, U.S.

Career

Early career
Korpi began skating at the age of five, following her older sister. She landed her first triple jump, a salchow, when she was 11 or 12.

In 2003, Korpi finished 19th in her first appearance at the World Junior Championships. The following season, making her ISU Junior Grand Prix (JGP) debut, she placed 6th in Slovenia and took the bronze medal in Poland. She ranked 16th at the 2004 World Junior Championships.

2004–2005 season
Returning to the JGP series, Korpi placed 6th in Hungary before winning gold in Germany. She received a host wildcard spot at the JGP Final, where she finished fourth. She was awarded the silver medal at the 2005 Finnish Championships and was assigned to the 2005 European Championships, where she placed 13th. She then competed at the 2005 World Junior Championships, where she came in tenth, her best finish at the event.

2005–2006 season
Competing in the JGP series, Korpi placed 7th in Slovakia and won the bronze medal in Estonia. After taking the bronze medal at the 2006 Finnish Championships, she was assigned to the 2006 European Championships, which the Finnish skating federation had decided to use to determine the Olympic team. Korpi's European result, 6th, allowed her to compete at the 2006 Winter Olympics in Turin, where she finished 16th.

2006–2007 season

In the 2006–07 season, Korpi made her senior Grand Prix debut. She placed 4th at the 2007 Finnish Nationals, then went to the 2007 European Championships and won the bronze medal, making her the second Finnish ladies' singles skater to ever win a European medal. She finished 14th at Worlds.

2007–2008 season
Early in the 2007–08 season, Korpi suffered an esophagus infection, flu, and sinusitis, causing her to miss her first Grand Prix event. Korpi was 5th at the 2008 European Championships. At the 2008 Worlds, she was 4th after the short program but had a poor long program and ended up in ninth place.

2008–2009 season
Korpi did not participate in the Grand Prix series. Later that season, she became the Finnish national champion, a title she had previously won on the junior level. She was again 5th at the European Championships and won the bronze medal at the 2009 Winter Universiade, her final event of the season.

2009–2010 season
Korpi began her season with podium finishes at the Nebelhorn Trophy and the Finlandia Trophy, as well as her first senior Grand Prix medal, a silver at the Cup of China. She was unable to defend her national title, however, finishing second behind Laura Lepistö. At the European Championships, she was in second after the short program, but her performance in the long program kept her off the podium. Korpi was 11th at the 2010 Winter Olympics but only 19th a month later at the World Championships.

2010–2011 season
Korpi decided to try new choreographers, and worked on her competitive programs with Shae-Lynn Bourne and David Wilson. She began the season at the 2010 Nebelhorn Trophy, which she won for the first time in her career. Her assigned Grand Prix events were the 2010 NHK Trophy and the 2010 Trophée Eric Bompard. She placed fourth at the NHK Trophy, then won her first Grand Prix title at the Trophée Eric Bompard. The combined results left her as the first alternate for the Grand Prix Final. Her next event was Finnish nationals, which she won for the second time in her career. Korpi won the bronze medal at the 2011 European Championships.

2011–2012 season

In July 2011, Korpi injured the metatarsus in her foot, resulting in her withdrawal from the 2011 Japan Open and 2011 Finlandia Trophy. She resumed practicing toe jumps in October and said they were going well but she did not feel they were completely ready for the 2011 NHK Trophy, where she finished 6th. She was fifth at the 2011 Cup of Russia. She successfully defended her national title at the 2012 Finnish Figure Skating Championships in December.

Korpi won her third medal at the Europeans, finishing second behind Carolina Kostner despite hurting her upper leg a few weeks before the championships. She withdrew from the 2012 World Championships two weeks prior to the event, citing lingering foot and hip injuries.

2012–2013 season

Korpi began her season at the 2012 Finlandia Trophy, where she won the silver medal. She then won her third Grand Prix medal, a bronze, at the 2012 Cup of China. At the 2012 Rostelecom Cup, Korpi won the second GP title of her career and qualified for her first Grand Prix Final. In doing so, she became the first Finnish figure skater to ever qualify for the final. She finished fourth at the event. Korpi's next event was the 2013 Finnish Nationals, where she took the gold medal. Korpi withdrew from the 2013 European Championships due to inflammation in her left Achilles tendon. She missed the 2013 World Championships for the same reason.

2013–2014 season
On 23 August 2013, Korpi confirmed a coaching change to Rafael Arutyunyan in Lake Arrowhead, California. She was assigned to two Grand Prix events, the 2013 Skate Canada International and the 2013 Trophee Eric Bompard, but had to withdraw from both due to an Achilles tendon injury sustained in September. Carlos Avila de Borba became one of her coaches in December 2013. After an operation in April 2014 due to necrosis, she wore a cast for six weeks and resumed training in late June.

2014–2015 season
Korpi made her return to competition at the 2014 CS Golden Spin of Zagreb after a two-year hiatus due to injuries. She finished 4th in the short but moved up in the free skate to win the event. She won her fifth national title in December. She competed at the 2015 European Championships in Stockholm, placing fourth in the short program. However, Korpi withdrew from the competition before the free skate citing illness. She placed 31st at the 2015 World Championships.

Later career
Korpi initially planned to compete in the 2015–2016 season. She was assigned to the 2015 Trophée Éric Bompard, but withdrew from the event. On 27 August 2015, she announced her retirement from competitive skating at a press conference in Helsinki. In a later interview, she stated that she had been struggling with anxiety. She also said, "Every time I started training, I got injured. I was mentally very empty. I took time for myself to think about what I need to do. I knew that I cannot continue competing."

Korpi has continued to perform in ice shows. She signed up to appear as an athlete ambassador and work for Finnish TV at the 2017 World Championships in Helsinki.

Programs

Competitive highlights

GP: Grand Prix; CS: Challenger Series; JGP: Junior Grand Prix

Detailed results

References

External links

 

1988 births
Living people
Figure skaters at the 2006 Winter Olympics
Finnish female single skaters
Olympic figure skaters of Finland
Sportspeople from Tampere
Figure skaters at the 2010 Winter Olympics
European Figure Skating Championships medalists
Universiade medalists in figure skating
Universiade bronze medalists for Finland
Competitors at the 2009 Winter Universiade
Finnish expatriates in Italy
Finnish expatriates in the United States